Karađorđe's Park railway station is an underground rail station in Savski Venac, Belgrade, Serbia. It is located at European route E70 in the municipality of Savski Venac. It is served by BG Voz. The railway continues to Prokop in one direction, and Vukov Spomenik in the other direction. Karađorđe's Park railway station consists of 2 railway tracks.

Gallery

See also 
 Serbian Railways
 Beovoz
 BG Voz

References

External links 
 
 Karađorđe's Park railway station

Railway stations in Belgrade